The Futurist is the debut studio album by American actor Robert Downey Jr., produced by Jonathan Elias and Mark Hudson, and released on November 23, 2004 through Sony Classical. The album debuted at number 121 on the Billboard 200 chart, selling 16,000 copies in its first week.

The album received mixed reviews. Downey stated in 2006 that he probably will not do another album, as he felt that the energy he put into doing the album was not compensated. He explained that he did not want to spend whatever time he had at home in the studio, but rather with his family. "Broken" plays during the end credits to Downey's 2005 film Kiss Kiss Bang Bang.

Recording and composition

The Futurist consists of eight pop ballads written by Downey, as well as two cover songs: "Smile", a Charlie Chaplin composition; and "Your Move", the first half of the song "I've Seen All Good People" by Yes. The song "Hannah" is an allusion to Downey's 2000 film Wonder Boys.

The album was produced by Jonathan Elias and Mark Hudson, with Downey playing on the piano on some of the tracks.

Critical reception

AllMusic's Matt Collar rated the album 3.5/5, and called Downey's lyrics "obtuse". However, he praised his interpretations of other musicians' work, such as "Your Move" by Yes and Charlie Chaplin's "Smile", and called the album "unpredictably moving as the best of Downey's film work."

Elysa Gardner of USA Today wrote that the vibe on Downey's album "can seem pretentious or simply dull after a while, but there is a moody musicality to tracks such as 'Man Like Me' and 'Details'."

Track listing

Personnel
Credits adapted from AllMusic.

Robert Downey Jr. – lead and background vocals, piano, keyboards, Wurlitzer, percussion, photography, CD art adaptation
Jon Anderson – background vocals on "Your Move"
Charlie Bisharat – violin
Alan Broadbent – piano
Jeff Bunnell – fluglehorn
Tom Canning – Hammond B3
Jim Cox – Hammond B3, piano
Gregg Bissonette – drums
Vinnie Colaiuta – drums
Chad Wackerman – drums
Alec Puro – drums
Armand Sabal-Lecco – bass
Nat Williamson – violin
Jenny Harding-Morris – guest writer – "Man Like Me"
James Woods-Tickton – bass arrangements
Lawrence Schwartz – string arrangements
Cameron Stone – cello
Jimmy Haun – electric guitar
Charlie Haden – bass guitar
Reggie Hamilton – bass
Sarah Hudson – background vocals
Steve Dudas – balalaika, acoustic guitar, electric guitar

Jonathan Elias – production, Hammond organ, photography
Mark Hudson – production, acoustic guitar, electric guitar, percussion, background vocals, photography
Kevin Churko – engineering
Doug Reid – engineering
Vicenzo LoRusso – engineering, production, photography
Bruce Sugar – engineering
Lior Goldenberg – mixing
Dave Way – mixing
Bernie Grundman – mastering
Ghian Wright – engineering assistant
Vasilia Hughes – production assistant
Carles Sanchez – production assistant
Mark Valentine – assistant
Amy Galland – photography, production coordination
Jimmy "Sprünge" LaRiccio – photography
Augustine Dei Wojogbe – art direction, design
Davis Factor – cover art
Indio Falconer Downey – CD art adaptation
Robert Wilson – portraits
Russell Nachman

In other media
In the 2016 Marvel Studios film, Captain America: Civil War, Clint Barton mockingly refers to Tony Stark (played by Downey) as "The Futurist".

Chart performance

Album

"Man Like Me"

References

2004 debut albums
Albums produced by Jonathan Elias